is a network of Brazilian international schools in Japan. It has campuses in Aichi, Gunma, Mie, and Shizuoka prefectures. The campuses, which have about 2,000 students as of 2015, serve the ensino fundamental (primary through lower secondary) and ensino médio (upper secondary or senior high school/sixth form college) levels.

As of 2015 Tomu Kurahashi is the head of EAS.

The school system began in 1995.

Campuses
Aichi Prefecture
 EAS Hekinan - Unit IV
 EAS Toyohashi - Unit VI
 EAS Toyota - Unit I
Shizuoka Prefecture
 EAS Hamamatsu: Higashi-ku, Hamamatsu - Unit V
Mie Prefecture
 EAS Suzuka - Unit II
Gunma Prefecture
 Unidade Colegio EAS Rede Pitágoras in Ota

Previously there were two campuses in Toyohashi: Toyohashi I and Toyohashi II.

See also

 Brazilians in Japan
 Hamamatsu Municipal Senior High School - Japanese municipal high school with a large non-Japanese enrollment
Japanese international schools in Brazil:
 Escola Japonesa de São Paulo
 Associação Civil de Divulgação Cultural e Educacional Japonesa do Rio de Janeiro
 Escola Japonesa de Manaus

References

External links
  Escola Alegria de Saber
  Unidade Colegio EAS Rede Pitagoras (Archive)

Brazilian international schools
International schools in Japan
Schools in Aichi Prefecture
Education in Gunma Prefecture
Education in Shizuoka Prefecture
Education in Mie Prefecture
Elementary schools in Japan
Schools in Hamamatsu
High schools in Aichi Prefecture
1995 establishments in Japan
Educational institutions established in 1995
High schools in Gunma Prefecture
High schools in Shizuoka Prefecture
High schools in Mie Prefecture